Eumundi railway station is located on the North Coast line in Queensland, Australia. It serves the town of Eumundi in the Sunshine Coast Region.

History
The original Eumundi railway station opened in 1891 on Gympie Road (now Memorial Drive) opposite Gridley Street  as part of the opening of the North Coast line; it is now the site of the Eumundi Markets. The current railway station opened in 1988 when a  deviation was built as part of the electrification of the North Coast line.

The station today consists of one platform with a steel shelter. In 2009, the platform was extended with scaffolding and plywood materials. Initially intended as an interim arrangement until a permanent extension was built, the temporary platform remained until December 2019. A permanent reconstruction of the platform commenced in May 2019 and was completed by December 2019. Eumundi, unlike most other stations on the line, doesn't have a passing loop, although these exists a few kilometres north and south of the station.

Services
Eummundi is serviced by two daily City network services in each direction.

Services by platform

Transport links
Sunbus' routes 630 and 631 Noosa Junction to Nambour station serve Eumundi station.

References

External links

Eumundi station Queensland Rail
Eumundi station Queensland's Railways on the Internet

North Coast railway line, Queensland
Railway stations in Sunshine Coast, Queensland
Railway stations in Australia opened in 1988